Poxdorf is a municipality in the district of Forchheim in Bavaria in Germany.

References

Forchheim (district)